This article lists the Imerina monarchs, from the earliest origins of the Merina monarchy until the French conquest of the Merina Kingdom during the Second Madagascar expedition.

Early monarchs in the Merina line
Below is a list of the line of Merina monarchs that ruled in the Central Highlands of Madagascar and from whom were issued the first true monarchs of a united Madagascar in the 19th century. Before the uniting of Madagascar, succession was based on the current monarch's designation of an heir, typically from among his or her own children. As such, the list below represents a direct genealogical line from the last 19th-century queen of Madagascar to some of the earliest known rulers identified in the 15th century or before. Prior to the 16th century, detailed information about the names and dates of Merina rulers becomes less consistent.  Genealogy in this early period are derived primarily from oral history, while later names and dates are verifiable from primary sources.  These combined sources provide the following list of Merina rulers preceding Andrianampoinimerina's unification of Imerina in the Central Highlands and his son Radama I's successful conquest of the majority of Madagascar, bringing the island under his rule.

Asterisks denote names drawn from oral history without substantive evidence to verify the ruler's life or reign, viz., legendary or semi-legendary monarchs.

Andrianerinerina* (Son of God incarnate. According to popular belief, descended from the skies and established his kingdom at Anerinerina)  
Andriananjavonana* 
Andrianamponga I* 
Andrianamboniravina* 
Andriandranolava (Andranolava)* 
Andrianampandrandrandava (Rafandrandrava)* 
Andriamasindohafandrana (Ramasindohafandrana)* 
Rafandrampohy* 
Andriampandramanenitra (Rafandramanenitra)* 
Queen Rangita (Rangitamanjakatrimovavy) (1520–1530) 
Queen Rafohy (1530–1540) 
King Andriamanelo (1540–1575) 
King Ralambo (1575–1612) 
King Andrianjaka (1612–1630) 
King Andriantsitakatrandriana (1630–1650) 
King Andriantsimitoviaminandriandehibe (1650–1670) 
King Andrianjaka Razakatsitakatrandriana (1670–1675) 
King Andriamasinavalona (Andrianjakanavalondambo) (1675–1710) 
King Andriantsimitoviaminiandriana Andriandrazaka (Andriantsimitoviaminandriandrazaka) (1710–1730) 
King Andriambelomasina (1730–1770) 
King Andrianjafynandriamanitra (Andrianjafinjanahary or Andrianjafy) (1770–1787) 
King Andrianampoinimerina (1787–1810)

Monarchs of the Kingdom of Madagascar (1810–1897)

Timeline

Monarchs family tree

After the fall

After the fall of the Royal House, and the death of the last ruling Sovereign, Queen Ranavalona III's heir apparent, Princess Marie-Louise of Madagascar, remained. She died childless in 1948.

See also
Central Highlands (Madagascar)
Merina people
Merina Kingdom
List of colonial governors of Madagascar
List of presidents of Madagascar
Prime Minister of Madagascar

References

Sources 

Madagascar history-related lists
Lists of monarchs

African monarchs
Former monarchies of Africa
Former countries in Africa